Seven Guns to Mesa is a 1958 Western film directed by Edward Dein.

Cast
Charles Quinlivan as John Trey
Lola Albright as Julie Westcott
James Griffith as Papa Clellan
Jay Adler as Ben Avery
Jack Carr as Sam Denton
John Cliff as Simmons
Burt Nelson  as Bear
John Merrick as Brown
Charles Keane as Marsh
Rush Williams as Duncan
Gerald Frank as Crandall
Don Sullivan as Louis Middleton
Reed Howes as Stage Driver
Mauritz Hugo as Lt. Franklin

External links

1958 films
1958 Western (genre) films
Allied Artists films
American black-and-white films
American Western (genre) films
Films scored by Leith Stevens
1950s English-language films
Films directed by Edward Dein
1950s American films